is a river that crosses the prefectures of Kyoto and Mie in Japan, a tributary of the Yodo River. The city of Kizugawa in Kyoto prefecture is named after the river.

References 

Rivers of Kyoto Prefecture
Rivers of Mie Prefecture
Rivers of Japan